Samuel Clowes may refer to:
 Samuel Clowes (Conservative politician) (1821–1898), English Conservative politician, MP for North Leicestershire 1868–1880
 Samuel Clowes (Labour politician) (1864–1928), English Labour politician, MP for Hanley 1924–1928

See also 
 Clowes (surname)